Kaj Czarnecki (10 September 1936 – 13 January 2018) was a Finnish fencer. He competed in the individual and team épée events at the 1960 Summer Olympics.

References

1936 births
2018 deaths
Sportspeople from Helsinki
Finnish male épée fencers
Olympic fencers of Finland
Fencers at the 1960 Summer Olympics